"Trap Paris" is a song by American musician Machine Gun Kelly featuring fellow American musicians Quavo and Ty Dolla $ign. It was released on April 13, 2017, via Bad Boy and Interscope.

Background and concept
The song is originally about a night in Berlin but Machine Gun Kelly felt that "Germany" had too many syllables, whereas Paris was "just so quick". Kelly hesitated to add a second verse to the song, and seeing as the album does not have that many collaborations, he decided to more collaborations. He contacted Quavo for a possible feature. Quavo responded by sending his verse. Kelly got Dolla Sign on the song after they were at Sean Combs's house party and traded numbers for a feature. Ty recorded the chorus the following day. This was Kelly and Ty Dolla Sign's first time working together. The song was officially released on April 13, 2017.

Music video
The music video was released June 7, 2017 and it was directed by Ben Griffin. As of March 2023, the music video has received over 41 million views.

Charts

Certifications

References

2017 singles
2017 songs
Machine Gun Kelly (musician) songs
Quavo songs
Ty Dolla Sign songs
Songs written by Machine Gun Kelly (musician)
Songs written by Quavo
Songs written by Ty Dolla Sign

Songs written by Sonny Digital
Songs about Paris